The Roman Catholic Diocese of Duitama–Sogamoso is a diocese located in the cities of Duitama and Sogamoso in the Ecclesiastical province of Tunja in Colombia.

History
7 March 1955: Established as Diocese of Duitama from Diocese of Tunja
4 June 1994: Renamed as Diocese of Duitama – Sogamoso

Special churches
Minor Basilicas:
Basilica de Mongui, Duitama

Bishops

Ordinaries
José Joaquín Flórez Hernández † (7 Mar 1955 – 17 Mar 1964) Appointed, Bishop of Ibagué
Julio Franco Arango † (4 Jun 1964 – 16 Sep 1980) Died
Jesús María Coronado Caro, S.D.B. † (30 Jul 1981 – 21 Jun 1994) Retired
Carlos Prada Sanmiguel † (21 Jun 1994 Appointed – 15 Oct 2012) Resigned
Misael Vacca Ramirez (18 Apr 2015 Appointed - )

Other priest of this diocese who became bishop
Marco Antonio Merchán Ladino, appointed Bishop of Vélez in 2016

See also
Roman Catholicism in Colombia

Sources

External links
 GCatholic.org

Roman Catholic dioceses in Colombia
Roman Catholic Ecclesiastical Province of Tunja
Christian organizations established in 1955
Roman Catholic dioceses and prelatures established in the 20th century
1955 establishments in Colombia